Smullen is a surname. Notable people with the surname include:

Pat Smullen (born 1977), Irish jockey
Stanley B. Smullen (1906–1998), American businessman